Gregg Daniel is an actor and stage director best known for his roles in the HBO show True Blood and Insecure. Daniels also has a background in theater, including winning the NAACP Theater Award as "Best Director" for his production of Fences at the International City Theater. He is also a faculty member for USC School of Dramatic Arts where he teaches students about directing. He is married to actress, Veralyn Jones.

Career 
Gregg Daniel is a 62-year-old African American actor born in Brooklyn, New York. Over the course of his career, Daniels has acted in many in film and television, such as his roles in 2018's Truth of Dare, his role as Reverend Daniels in HBO's True Blood, and his role as Easley Barton in ABC's 50 Cent For Life. 

He has acted and directed in various genres. Being a dramatic arts Professor at USC, he has directed plays such as Gem of the Ocean, A Raisin In The Sun, Les Blancs, and Wedding Band. He also has been featured in plays like, A Christmas Carol, All the Way, and Death Of A Salesman as a stage actor. One of his directed plays, Elmina's Kitchen, won the NAACP for "Best Ensemble" in 2013.

Work 
Television

Film

Video Game

Theater 
Directing

Acting

Awards 

 2016 NAACP Best Director award for the International City Theatre's production of Fences by August Wilson 
 Nominated for a 2013 NAACP Image Award for helming the Los Angeles production of Elmina's Kitchen, which also won the NAACP Award for Best Ensemble

References

External links 

 

African-American theater directors
American theatre directors
Living people
Male actors from New York City
Year of birth missing (living people)
American male television actors
American male stage actors
American male film actors
20th-century American male actors
21st-century American male actors
African-American male actors
People from Brooklyn
University of Southern California faculty